The Tivoid languages are a branch of the Southern Bantoid languages spoken in parts of Nigeria and Cameroon. The subfamily takes its name after Tiv, the most spoken language in the group.

The majority are threatened with extinction. The largest of these languages by far is the Tiv language for which the group is named; it had 2 million speakers in 1991. The second largest is the Bitare language; it had 110,000 speakers in 2000. Most apart from Tiv are extremely poorly known, and the next best, Esimbi, has not even been demonstrated to be Tivoid.

Languages
Following Blench (2010), Tivoid languages fall into three branches, though North Tivoid languages are almost unattested. The names in parentheses are dialects per Ethnologue, separate languages per Blench:
Central Tivoid A: Tiv–Iyive–Otank, Evant; Ceve (Oliti)
 B: Caka (Batanga, Asaka), Ipulo (Olulu), Eman (Amanavil)
Mesaka (Ugarə)
North Tivoid Batu (Afi, Kamino), Abon, Bitare, ? Ambo

Esimbi is well attested, but there is not much reason to consider it Tivoid; it has just about as much in common with Grassfields languages. The status of Buru within Tivoid is also uncertain.

SIL Ethnologue lists three additional languages, Manta, Balo and Osatu, based on an old, provisional assignment of Blench; Blench (2010) states they are instead in the Southwest Grassfields (Western Momo) family.

The Momo languages, traditionally classified as Grassfields, may be closer to Tivoid, though that may be an effect of contact.

Menchum, traditionally classified as Grassfields, may also be a Grassfields language or closer to Tivoid.

Names and locations (Nigeria)
Below is a list of Tivoid language names, populations, and locations (in Nigeria only) from Blench (2019).

See also
Tivoid word lists (Wiktionary)

Notes

References
Blench, Roger. 2010. The Tivoid Languages
Blench, Roger. 2016. The Tivoid Languages: overview and comparative word list.

 
Southern Bantoid languages